Ihor Oleksandrovych Sikorskyi (born 29 July 1988) is a Ukrainian amateur football striker who plays for Juniors Shpytky.

Career
In January 2020 he was expelled from the club Ahrobiznes Volochysk after a trip to Russia to visit his relatives during the Russo-Ukrainian War. Sikorskyi expressed his surprise with the decision of the club, because other sportsmen used to visit Russia without problems, but he did not contest club's action.

References

External links
 
 
 Official Website Profile

1988 births
Ukrainian footballers
Ukrainian expatriate footballers
Living people
Sportspeople from Kyiv
FC Zorya Luhansk players
FC Stal Alchevsk players
FC Daugava players
FC Helios Kharkiv players
MFC Mykolaiv players
NK Veres Rivne players
FC Hirnyk-Sport Horishni Plavni players
FC Ahrobiznes Volochysk players
FC Chornomorets Odesa players
FC Volyn Lutsk players
FC Metalist Kharkiv players
FC Peremoha Dnipro players
Ukrainian Premier League players
Ukrainian First League players
Ukrainian Second League players
Association football forwards
Ukrainian expatriate sportspeople in Latvia
Expatriate footballers in Latvia
Expatriate footballers in Bangladesh